"This Is Why" is a song by American rock band Paramore, released as the lead single from their sixth studio This Is Why, on September 28, 2022. It was written by Hayley Williams, Taylor York, and Zac Farro and produced by Carlos de la Garza. The song was accompanied by its music video, released the same day.

Background
"This Is Why" was released on September 28, 2022. It was the last song written for the album, at which point Williams was "tired of writing lyrics", although guitarist Taylor York convinced Williams and drummer Zac Farro to work on one "last idea". Williams stated that it "summarizes the plethora of ridiculous emotions, the rollercoaster of being alive in 2022, having survived even just the last three or four years" and thought that following the COVID-19 pandemic and "the impending doom of a dying planet", "that humans would have found it deep within themselves to be kinder or more empathetic or something".

Composition
"This Is Why" has been described as a funk, indie pop, post-punk, pop punk, dance-punk, alternative rock, soul, and dance song. It is the band's first title track.

Critical reception

Quinn Moreland of Pitchfork wrote that the track "builds on the funky pop that colored 2017's After Laughter, but shifts away from its predecessor's bright gloss for something muddier and vaguely threatening" and called the chorus "spiky" with instrumentation from marimbas making for a "suspense[ful]" bridge, after which "the song creeps forward, ultimately never pulling itself out of its paranoid spiral". Ali Shutler of NME described it as a "snarling, defiant middle finger to the haters" and a "giddy statement of purpose" with "newfound urgency to the party-starting music that takes influence from their angsty days as scrappy pop-punkers" accompanied by a "disco stomp". Steffanee Wang of Nylon called it a "disillusioned anthem" as well as "explosive" and remarked that it "sonically fits in the neat in-between space between [the band's] older pop-punk stuff and the electronic contemporary sound of 2017's After Laughter".

Accolades

Music video
The music video was released the same day as the song, and was directed by Brendan Yates of the American punk band Turnstile and filmed in Malibu, California. It depicts the band performing and "frolick[ing ...] in the Malibu wilderness, amid the grasses, against the blue sky, and [...] in the spare interiors of a house".

Personnel

 Hayley Williams – vocals, backing vocals, percussion, piano, composition
 Taylor York – backing vocals, glockenspiel, guitar, keyboards, programming, vibraphone, composition
 Zac Farro – backing vocals, drums, glockenspiel, keyboards, percussion, programming, vibraphone, composition
 Carlos de la Garza – production, backing vocals
 Brian Robert Jones – bass guitar
 Henry Solomon – bass clarinet, clarinet, flute
 Phil Danyew – glockenspiel, keyboards, programming
 Em Mancini – mastering
 Manny Marroquin – mixing
 Harriet Tam – engineering
 Kyle McAulay – engineering assistance
 Patrick Kehrier – engineering assistance
 Scott Moore – engineering assistance
 Joey Mullen – drum technician
 Erik Bailey – guitar technician
 Joanne Almeida – guitar technician

Charts

Release history

References

2022 singles
2022 songs
Paramore songs
Songs written by Hayley Williams
Songs written by Taylor York
Atlantic Records singles